This article displays the rosters for the participating teams at the 1998 FIBA Africa Championship.

|}
| valign="top" |
 Head coach

 Assistant coach

Legend
 (C) Team captain
 Club field describes current club
|}

References

External links
angelfire.com

FIBA Africa Under-18 Championship squads